State Route 135 (SR-135) is a short divided state highway in northern Utah County, Utah, United States. The majority of the route runs along Pleasant Grove Boulevard.

Route description

SR-135 is a four-lane connector road that runs through formerly agricultural area that has recently been developed commercially.  

The route begins at a four-way intersection with 2800 West on the border line of American Fork and Lindon.

After turning northeast, SR-135 quickly reaches the diamond interchange with I-15 (Exit 275), which has been substantially landscaped (xeriscape) since its construction. As is crosses over I-15 the route leaves Lindon and enters Pleasant Grove, becoming Pleasant Grove Boulevard. Northeast of I-15, SR-135 continues northeast and the westbound lanes connect with the south end of Granite Way before the route reaches its eastern terminus at SR-129 (North County Boulevard). The roadway continues northeast towards downtown Pleasant Grove, ultimately connecting with State Street (US-89).

History
In 2002, a new roadway was complete in northwest Lindon and southwest Pleasant Grove. The road included a new interchange along I-15 and connected 600 North in Lindon (to the southwest) with State Street (US-89) in Pleasant Grove (at what was formerly a three way intersection with Center Street). The most of the new road was named Pleasant Grove Boulevard. Four years later, with the completion of North County Boulevard (SR-129), the section of the roadway between 2800 West and North County Boulevard (SR-129) was designated as State Route 135.

Major intersections

See also

 List of highways numbered 135

Notes

References

External links

 Utah Department of Transportation Highway Referencing: Route 135 (PDF)
 Utah Department of Transportation Highway Resolutions: Route 135 (PDF)Note: As of April 2019, the Resolutions for Route 135 have not be updated to include the current state route.

135
 135
Streets in Utah